(born January 6, 1975 in Nara) is a retired male boxer from Japan. He represented his native country twice at the Summer Olympics: in 1996 and 2000. After having competed in the men's flyweight division (– 51 kg) in Atlanta, Georgia he changed weights, and fought in the bantamweight class (– 54 kg) in Sydney, Australia. There he was stopped in the second round by Cuba's eventual gold medalist Guillermo Rigondeaux.

References
sports-reference

1975 births
Living people
Flyweight boxers
Bantamweight boxers
Boxers at the 1996 Summer Olympics
Boxers at the 2000 Summer Olympics
Olympic boxers of Japan
Sportspeople from Nara Prefecture
Boxers at the 1994 Asian Games
Boxers at the 1998 Asian Games
Boxers at the 2002 Asian Games
Japanese male boxers
Asian Games competitors for Japan